Henry Clay McWhorter (February 20, 1836 – April 15, 1913) was a lawyer, judge, and politician in West Virginia.

McWhorter served in the Union Army, reaching the rank of captain. He resigned from active service in 1863 due to a wound and spent the remainder of the war as a clerk in the provost marshal's office. After the war he was admitted to the bar (1866) and spent four terms in the West Virginia House of Delegates, serving as Speaker 1868-9. He was again a Delegate from 1885-7. McWhorter attended the 1868 Republican Party convention as an at-large delegate from West Virginia. He was an unsuccessful Republican candidate for the Supreme Court of Appeals of West Virginia in 1888, but in 1896 he was elected to the court for a twelve-year term.

McWhorter served on the board of trustees of West Virginia Wesleyan College from the institution's founding in 1890 to his death in 1913; he served as president of the board from 1897 until 1913.

McWhorter was married four times. He married Mary Hardman in 1857; she died in 1878. He married Eliza F. McWhorter in 1879; she died in 1881. He married Lucy M. Clark in 1885; she died in 1900. He married Caroline M. Gates in 1904.

Henry C. McWhorter's brother Joseph M. McWhorter (1828–1913) was also a notable West Virginia lawyer, politician, and judge.

References

Justices of the Supreme Court of Appeals of West Virginia
1836 births
1913 deaths
People from Delaware County, Ohio
People of West Virginia in the American Civil War
Speakers of the West Virginia House of Delegates
Republican Party members of the West Virginia House of Delegates
West Virginia lawyers
Military personnel from West Virginia
Union Army officers
19th-century American judges
19th-century American lawyers
West Virginia Wesleyan College trustees